The Württemberg D was a class of 14 locomotives of the Royal Württemberg State Railways (Königlich Württembergische Staats-Eisenbahnenen, K.W.St.E.)

They were designed for the Ulm to Bretten via Stuttgart line. They were a four-cylinder de Glehn compound.

After the First World War, only eight locomotives went to the Deutsche Reichsbahn, who allocated them the numbers 38 101 to 38 108; however, they were not in active service, and were scrapped in 1924.

Four went to Poland, where the PKP classed them as Ok102. Two (426 and 429) went to France as reparations, and were allocated to the Chemins de fer de l'État, who renumbered them 230-985 and 230-986; they were little used, 230-986 was withdrawn circa 1930, and 230-985 was scrapped in 1934.

They were equipped with type 2′2′ T tenders.

References

4-6-0 locomotives
Esslingen locomotives
D
Compound locomotives
Standard gauge locomotives of Germany
2′C n4v locomotives
Passenger locomotives